Blades is a 1989 American horror comedy film directed by Thomas R. Rondinella and distributed by Troma Entertainment. Filmed in 50 days in Cape May County, New Jersey, it has been described by its director as a parody of Jaws.

Premise
A possessed lawn mower has been attacking and dismembering the members of a prestigious country club on the club's golf course. Two golfers and a groundskeeper set out to destroy the mower.

Release
The film received a limited theatrical release (such as in a grindhouse theater in Times Square), and was later broadcast on HBO. It was released on VHS and was later released on DVD as a triple feature with two other Troma titles, Blood Hook and Zombie Island Massacre.

References

External links
 
 Official webpage at Troma Films
 

1989 films
1989 horror films
American independent films
Troma Entertainment films
Golf films
1980s English-language films
1980s American films